Jacques Villeret (6 February 1951 – 28 January 2005) was a French actor, best known internationally for his role as François Pignon in the comedy Le Dîner de Cons. During his career, he earned many awards including the prestigious medal and title of Chevalier de la Légion d'Honneur.

Life and career
Villeret was born Jacky Boufroura in Loches, Indre-et-Loire, France, to an Algerian father and a French mother. He studied at the Conservatoire de Paris (CNSAD) in the same class as Louis Seigner, the grandfather of Emmanuelle Seigner and Mathilde Seigner. While he was most famous for his role as François Pignon in Le Dîner de Cons; both on the stage and in the film, his other celebrated roles included the extra terrestrial in La soupe aux choux, the autistic Mo in L'été en pente douce, and marshal Ludwig von Apfelstrudel in Papy fait de la résistance.

At the time of making the film Un aller simple directed by Laurent Heynemann – a film about integration and racism and the clash of generations – Villeret said that watching the young actors in the film, Barbara Schulz and Lorant Deutsch, reminded him of the insouciance he had had as a young man with his friends at the Conservatoire. 

When his career was at its height, with the success of Le Dîner de Cons, everything collapsed in a tragedy mirroring the plot of the film. Villeret separated from his wife and suffered an enormous financial downfall due to tax issues, plunging him into depression. Villeret turned to alcohol for comfort, and became an alcoholic. He isolated himself and hid away for long periods. He later said: Alcohol is a friend, but a friend who means you harm.

Villeret's love of his profession helped to bring his career back from the brink. In an interview in 2001 he spoke of his admiration for performers like Johnny Hallyday and Jacques Brel for their level of commitment, and quoted the author Louis-Ferdinand Céline: When I write, I put my balls on the table.

In 1979 Villeret married Irina Tarassov, an actress and writer. They separated in 1998. Tarassov wrote about their life together in her book Un jour, tout ira bien. (One day, everything will go well). 

In 2002 Villeret met Seny, a Senegalese-French widow descended through her grandfather, Mor Diarra N'Dao, from a long line of Sérès nobles of the ancient Kingdom of Saloum, and they fell instantly and deeply in love. They were partners for three years, and she was about to move to Paris to be with him when he died in Évreux in January 2005 of a liver haemorrhage. Seny wrote a memoir of their life together, Jacques Villeret, mon bébé blanc, which was published in Paris by Le Cherche Midi in 2005.

Filmography
{| class="wikitable sortable"
|-
!Year
!Title
!Role
!Director
!Notes
|-
|1973
|R.A.S.
|Soldier Girot
|Yves Boisset
|
|-
|rowspan=3|1974
|Un amour de pluie
|Guillaume
|Jean-Claude Brialy
|
|-
|The Mouth Agape
|
|Maurice Pialat
|Uncredited
|-
|And Now My Love
|Spectator
|Claude Lelouch
|
|-
|rowspan=2|1975
|Serious as Pleasure
|Policeman
|Robert Benayoun
|
|-
|The Common Man
|Gérald
|Yves Boisset
|
|-
|rowspan=3|1976
|The Good and the Bad
|Simon
|Claude Lelouch
|
|-
|If I Had to Do It All Over Again
|Real Estate Broker
|Claude Lelouch
|
|-
|Les Naufragés de l'île de la Tortue
|Bernard 'Petit Nono' Dupoirier
|Jacques Rozier
|
|-
|1977
|Another Man, Another Chance
|Customer
|Claude Lelouch
|
|-
|rowspan=4|1978
|Robert et Robert
|Robert Villiers
|Claude Lelouch
|
|-
|Mon premier amour
|Jacques Labrousse
|Elie Chouraqui
|
|-
|Passe montagne
|Georges
|Jean-François Stévenin
|
|-
|Un balcon en forêt'''
|Soldier Gourcuff
|Michel Mitrani
|
|-
|rowspan=4|1979
|Confidences pour confidences|Job-Seeking Student
|Pascal Thomas
|
|-
|Us Two|Uncle Musique
|Claude Lelouch
|
|-
|Bête, mais discipliné|Jacques Cardot
|Claude Zidi
|
|-
|Rien ne va plus|Henri Fisserman / Paul Flantier / Bouli / Dr. Delomien / Jacques du Breuil / Robert Valier / Florence / Commissaire Blandin / Le patron de La Grenade / M. Fremelin
|Jean-Michel Ribes
|
|-
|rowspan=3|1981
|Malevil|Momo
|Christian de Chalonge
|
|-
|Les Uns et les Autres|Jacques
|Claude Lelouch
|
|-
|La Soupe aux choux|The Alien
|Jean Girault
|
|-
|1982
|The Big Brother|Inspector Coleau
|Francis Girod
|
|-
|rowspan=7|1983
|Danton|François Joseph Westermann
|Andrzej Wajda
|
|-
|Effraction|Valentin Tralande
|Daniel Duval
|
|-
|Édith et Marcel|Jacques Barbier
|Claude Lelouch
|
|-
|Circulez y'a rien à voir|Pelissier
|Patrice Leconte
|
|-
|First Name: Carmen|Man at the Petrol Station
|Jean-Luc Godard
|
|-
|Papy fait de la résistance|Ludwig Von Apfelstrudel
|Jean-Marie Poiré
|
|-
|Waiter!|Gilbert
|Claude Sautet
|
|-
|1984
|Les Morfalous|Béral
|Henri Verneuil
|
|-
|rowspan=3|1985
|Drôle de samedi|Maurice
|Tunç Okan
|
|-
|Hold-Up|Jérémie Planchet
|Alexandre Arcady
|
|-
|Les Folles Années du twist|Mr. John Wayne
|Mahmoud Zemmouri
|
|-
|rowspan=3|1986
|La galette du roi|Prince Utte of Danemark
|
|
|-
|Black Mic Mac|Michel Le Gorgues
|Thomas Gilou
|
|-
|Les Frères Petard|Momo
|Herve Palud
|
|-
|rowspan=2|1987
|L'été en pente douce|Maurice Leheurt, aka Mo
|Gérard Krawczyk
|
|-
|Keep Your Right Up|Man
|Jean-Luc Godard
|
|-
|rowspan=2|1988
|La petite amie|Guillaume Bertin
|Luc Béraud
|
|-
|Mangeclous|Salomon
|Moshé Mizrahi
|
|-
|1990
|Trois années|Alexandre Guillermen
|Fabrice Cazeneuve
|
|-
|rowspan=2|1991
|Les secrets professionnels du Dr Apfelglück|Martineau
|
|
|-
|The Favour, the Watch and the Very Big Fish|Charles, the lingerie expert
|Ben Lewin
|
|-
|rowspan=5|1992
|588, rue Paradis|Alexandre
|Henri Verneuil
|
|-
|Le bal des casse-pieds|Jérôme
|Yves Robert
|
|-
|Le fils du Mékong|Durieux
|François Leterrier
|
|-
|Le Batteur Du Boléro|Drummer
|Patrice Leconte
|Short
|-
|Mayrig|Alexandre
|Henri Verneuil
|2 episodes
|-
|1994
|Parano|Gas Station Attendant
|
|(episode "Nuit d'essence")
|-
|1996
|Golden Boy|Antoine Bonvoisin
|Jean-Pierre Vergne
|
|-
|rowspan=2|1998
|Le Dîner de Cons|François Pignon
|Francis Veber
|
|-
|Mookie|Brother Benoît
|Hervé Palud
|
|-
|1999
|The Children of the Marshland|Riton
|Jean Becker
|
|-
|2000
|Les Acteurs|Himself
|Bertrand Blier
|
|-
|rowspan=2|2001
|A Crime in Paradise|Jojo Braconnier
|Jean Becker
|
|-
|Un aller simple|Jean-Pierre
|Laurent Heynemann
|
|-
|rowspan=2|2003
|Strange Gardens|Jacques Pouzay
|Jean Becker
|
|-
|Le Furet|Le Furet
|Jean-Pierre Mocky
|
|-
|rowspan=2|2004
|Malabar Princess|Gaspard
|Gilles Legrand
|
|-
|Vipère au poing|Jacques Rézeau
|Philippe de Broca
|
|-
|rowspan=4|2005
|Iznogoud|Caliph Haroun El Poussah
|Patrick Braoudé
|
|-
|L'antidote|André Morin
|Vincent de Brus
|
|-
|Les âmes grises|Judge Mierck
|Yves Angelo
|
|-
|Les parrains|Lucien
|Frédéric Forestier
|
|}

Theatre
  1990 : La Contrebasse  1993 : Le Dîner de cons  2000 : Jeffrey Bernard est souffrantAwards
 1979 : César Award for Best Actor in a Supporting Role for Robert et Robert 1999 : César Award for Best Actor for Le Dîner de cons 1999 : Lumières Award for Best Actor for Le Dîner de cons''
 Chevalier des Arts et Lettres
 Légion d'honneur

References

External links

 
 
 Visit Jacques's grave in Perrusson near Loches, France

1951 births
2005 deaths
People from Loches
French people of Kabyle descent
French male film actors
French male stage actors
French male television actors
French National Academy of Dramatic Arts alumni
Best Supporting Actor César Award winners
Best Actor César Award winners
Best Actor Lumières Award winners
Deaths from liver disease
Deaths from bleeding